Princeton Nathan Lyman (November 20, 1935 – August 24, 2018) was a diplomat and former United States Ambassador to Nigeria (1986–89) and South Africa (1992–95), and former Assistant Secretary of State for International Organization Affairs (1996–98). He was a member of  the American Academy of Diplomacy and the Aspen Institute, and was Adjunct Senior Fellow for Africa Policy Studies with the Council on Foreign Relations.

Lyman had a bachelor's degree from the University of California, Berkeley and a Ph.D. from Harvard University.

In January, 2010, Lyman weighed in in opposition to using the U.S. Alien Tort Statute in federal court to gain reparations for South African workers, from corporations who operated in South Africa during the apartheid era.

In January, 2011, Lyman, who acted for the US government in mediation talks between the north and south of Sudan will be in Sudan for the independence referendum of Southern Sudan.

References

External links

1935 births
2018 deaths
Ambassadors of the United States to Nigeria
Politicians from San Francisco
University of California, Berkeley alumni
Harvard University alumni
Ambassadors of the United States to South Africa
Reagan administration personnel
George H. W. Bush administration personnel
Clinton administration personnel
Obama administration personnel